"Winter Song" is a song by British singer-songwriter Chris Rea, released in October 1991 as an extended play and as a track on the European edition of his eleventh studio album Auberge. "Winter Song" was written by Rea and produced by Jon Kelly. The EP, which was released to coincide with Rea's current tour of Britain, reached  27 on the UK Singles Chart and No. 30 in the Irish Singles Chart.

Critical reception
Upon its release, Music & Media wrote, "Rea has a good sense of the seasons. His last single was called 'Looking for the Summer', and now he reclaims his spot around the fireplace with this pleasant Dire Straits-like folk song." Gavin Martin of NME selected it as one of the "singles of the week" and commented, "The languorous pace and parched throaty rasp that worked wonders on the eerie evocation of 'Texas' basks in its full glory here. This is a gorgeous homily to fit the shortening days and the yearning heart. Rea takes his time and doesn't crowd out the mix." Jim Lawn of the Lennox Herald stated, "This single will certainly provide Rea with another hit. As winter and Christmas close in on us this single should fit the mood of the season." Peter Kinghorn of the Evening Chronicle described the song as a "superb" and "expressive" ballad.

Track listings
7-inch single (UK)
 "Winter Song" – 4:35
 "Footprints in the Snow" – 4:23
 "Tell Me There's a Heaven" – 6:04

7-inch single (Germany and France)
 "Winter Song" – 4:35
 "Footprints in the Snow" – 4:23
 "Set Me Free" – 5:38

CD single (UK and Europe)
 "Winter Song" – 4:35
 "Footprints in the Snow" – 4:23
 "Tell Me There's a Heaven" – 6:04
 "True to You" – 3:58

CD single (Germany)
 "Winter Song" – 4:35
 "Footprints in the Snow" – 4:23
 "Set Me Free" – 5:38
 "True to You" – 3:58

Personnel
"Winter Song"
 Chris Rea – guitar, slide guitar, Hammond organ
 Max Middleton – keyboards
 Robert Ahwai – bass
 Martin Ditcham – drums, percussion

Production
 Jon Kelly – producer (all tracks)
 Chris Rea – producer ("Tell Me There's a Heaven")
 Justin Shirley-Smith – engineer ("Winter Song")
 Russell Shaw – additional engineer ("Winter Song")

Other
 Stephen Sandon – individual photography
 Simon Fowler – background photography
 Stylorouge – design

Charts

References

1991 EPs
1991 songs
Chris Rea songs
East West Records EPs
Songs written by Chris Rea